Skulptur ('Sculpture') is a 1921 Yiddish language short book written by Joseph Chaikov. The book was the first book in Yiddish on sculpture. 

In Skulptur, Chaikov advocates avant-garde sculpture as a contribution to a new Jewish art. Skulptur was published by Melukhe Farlag in Kiev, and contains 15 pages.

References

1921 non-fiction books
Yiddish culture
Sculpture